Sutton District High School is a public high school in the York Region District School Board with approximately 500 students. It is located in  Sutton, Ontario, Canada and serves Grade 9 to 12 students. It is the primary secondary school for most communities in the town of Georgina, including Sutton West, Pefferlaw, and Udora. It had previously served the town's largest community, Keswick, but this changed with the opening of Keswick High School in 2000.

History
Sutton D.H.S. opened its doors in 1956. Revisions were made in 1962, and again in 1969.

Student life
The school offers a variety of athletic programs for students, including basketball, soccer, rugby, volleyball, baseball, curling, hockey, and more. There are various clubs, such as the Music Club, Art Club, the Gay Straight Alliance (GSA), and the Movie Club. As of September 2016, the school is a member of the FIRST Robotics Competition. Their team number is 6514, and their name is the Sutton Robotics League. In addition to clubs, the school has a student council and an athletic council.

See also
List of high schools in Ontario
 York Region District School Board
 Sutton, Ontario
 Georgina, Ontario

References and notes

External links
 Sutton District High School

York Region District School Board
High schools in the Regional Municipality of York
1956 establishments in Ontario
Educational institutions established in 1956